Intellipedia is an online system for collaborative data sharing used by the United States Intelligence Community (IC).  It was established as a pilot project in late 2005 and formally announced in April 2006. Intellipedia consists of three wikis running on the separate JWICS (Intellipedia-TS), SIPRNet (Intellipedia-S), and DNI-U  (Intellipedia-U) networks. The levels of classification allowed for information on the three wikis are Top Secret Sensitive Compartmented Information (TS SCI), Secret (S), and Sensitive But Unclassified (SBU or FOUO) information, respectively.  Each of the wikis is used by individuals with appropriate clearances from the 18 agencies of the US intelligence community and other national-security related organizations, including Combatant Commands and other federal departments. The wikis are not open to the public.

Intellipedia is a project of the Office of the Director of National Intelligence (ODNI) Intelligence Community Enterprise Services (ICES) office headquartered in Fort Meade, Maryland. It includes information on the regions, people, and issues of interest to the communities using its host networks. Intellipedia uses MediaWiki, the same software used by the Wikipedia free-content encyclopedia project. To the contrary of mainstream Wikipedia, its intelligence analogue encourages editing that incorporates personal points of view regardless of rank as it was decided that, "much of the self-corrective knowledge in the Intelligence Community resides in personal points of view," and that, "not all good ideas originate at the top."

The Secret version connected to SIPRNet predominantly serves Department of Defense and the Department of State personnel, many of whom do not use the Top Secret JWICS network on a day-to-day basis. Users on unclassified networks can access Intellipedia from remote terminals outside their workspaces via a VPN, in addition to their normal workstations. Open Source Intelligence (OSINT) users share information on the unclassified Intelink-U wiki.

History
Intellipedia was created to share information on some of the most difficult subjects facing U.S. intelligence and to bring cutting-edge technology into its ever-more-youthful workforce. It also allows information to be assembled and reviewed by a wide variety of sources and agencies, to address concerns that pre-war intelligence did not include robust dissenting opinions on Iraq's alleged weapons programs. A number of projects are under way to explore the use of the Intellipedia for the creation of traditional Intelligence Community products. In the summer of 2006, Intellipedia was the main collaboration tool in constructing a National Intelligence Estimate on Nigeria.

Intellipedia was at least partially inspired by a paper written for the Galileo Award (an essay competition set up by the CIA, later taken over by the DNI), which encouraged any employee at any intelligence agency to submit new ideas to improve information sharing. The first essay selected was by Calvin Andrus, chief technology officer of the Center for Mission Innovation at the CIA, entitled "The Wiki and the Blog: Toward a Complex Adaptive Intelligence Community". Andrus' essay argued that the real power of the Internet had come from the boom in self-publishing, and noted how the open-door policy of Wikipedia allowed it to cover new subjects quickly.

The original version was developed in beta form in late 2004 by technologists at the Defense Intelligence Agency, adapting MediaWiki open-source software for deployment on the DIA-managed JWICS SCI network. In 2005 DIA officials arranged to transfer the software and content to community-wide management under ODNI auspices, to increase the system's utility and comprehensiveness. Richard A. Russell, Deputy Assistant Director of National Intelligence for Information Sharing Customer Outreach (ISCO) said it was created so "analysts in different agencies that work X or Y can go in and see what other people are doing on subject X or Y and actually add in their two cents worth ... or documents that they have. ... What we're after here is 'decision superiority', not 'information superiority'. ... We have to get inside the decision cycle of the enemy. We have to be able to discover what they're doing and respond to it effectively."

In September 2007, sixteen months after being available community-wide, officials noted that the top-secret version of Intellipedia alone (hosted on JWICS) has 29,255 articles, with an average of 114 new articles and more than 6,000 edits to articles added each workday.

As of April 2009, the overall Intellipedia project hosted 900,000 pages edited by 100,000 users, with 5,000 page edits per day. As of January 2014, Intellipedia contained around 269,000 articles with the Top Secret Intellipedia counting 113,000 content pages with 255,000 users.

During the last weeks of the Obama administration, a large amount of information about the investigation into Russian election interference was dumped on the site. It was hoped that the site would prevent information on the topic to be "swept under a rug" by the incoming Trump administration and serve as "breadcrumbs" for congressional investigators.

10 years later
A 2017 two-part Wired series on Intellipedia and next steps reported that after 10 years of usage Intellipedia helped the IC get caught up to "Web 2.0" but never reformed how official reports were created like National Intelligence Estimates. A more official version of Intellipedia called the Living Intelligence System was created after the fact and focused on collaboratively writing official reports. It failed to catch on because each agency has a different process for writing official, classified reports. Based on the lessons learned from Intellipedia and the Living Intelligence System, a pilot program within the National Geospatial-Intelligence Agency created the Tearline apps focused on writing official collaborative reports in the less bureaucratic space of unclassified content.

Potential problems
In 2006, some were concerned that individual intelligence agencies will create their own wikis, draining ideas and input from Intellipedia. Sean Dennehy, a CIA official involved in integrating the system into the intelligence fabric, said disseminating material to the widest possible audience of analysts is key to avoiding mistakes. He said analysts from multiple agencies had used the network to post frequent updates on recent events, including the crash of a small plane into a New York City apartment building in October 2006 and North Korea's test of a missile in July 2006.

Some view it as risky because it allows more information to be viewed and shared; but according to Michael Wertheimer, McConnell's assistant deputy director for analysis, it is worth the risk. The project was greeted initially with "a lot of resistance," said Wertheimer, because it runs counter to past practice which sought to limit the pooling of information. He said there are risks in everything everyone does: "the key is risk management, not risk avoidance." Some encouragement has been necessary to spur contributions from the traditional intelligence community. However, he said the system appeals to the new generation of intelligence analysts because "this is how they like to work" and "it's a new way of thinking."

Successes

Thomas Fingar, Deputy Director of National Intelligence for Analysis (DDNI/A), cited the successful use of Intellipedia to develop an article on how Iraqi insurgents were using chlorine in improvised explosive devices saying, "They developed it in a couple of days interacting in Intellipedia,"..."No bureaucracy, no mother-may-I, no convening meetings. They did it and it came out pretty good. That's going to continue to grow."

In a September 10, 2007 testimony before the United States Congress, Michael McConnell, Director of National Intelligence, cited the increasing use of Intellipedia among analysts and its ability to help experts pool their knowledge, form virtual teams, and make quick assessments.

Analyzing Intelligence: Origins, Obstacles, and Innovations, a 2008 book by several experts in the field of intelligence analysis, cited Intellipedia as evidence of the changing nature of analysis.

Eric Haseltine, former ODNI Associate Director for Science and Technology said that "It's hard to overstate what [Burke and Dennehy] did . ... They made a major transformation almost overnight with no money after other programs failed to achieve these results with millions of dollars in funding."  Haseltine said intelligence analysts had "reacted 'more quickly and more intelligently' to potential terrorist threats than they would have without Intellipedia".

Community practices

The wiki provides so much flexibility that several offices throughout the community are using it to maintain and transfer knowledge on daily operations and events. Anyone with access to read it has permission to create and edit articles after registering and acquiring an account with Intelink. Since Intellipedia is intended to be a platform for harmonizing the various points of view of the agencies and analysts of the Intelligence Community, Intellipedia does not enforce a neutral point of view policy. Instead, viewpoints are attributed to the agencies, offices, and individuals participating, with the hope that a consensus view will emerge. Intellipedia also contains a great deal of non-encyclopedic content including meeting notes and items of internal, administrative interest. Deputy DNI Thomas Fingar made a comparison to eBay, the auction Web site where the reliability of sellers is rated by buyers. He said:

Intellipedia. It's been written up. It's the Wikipedia on a classified network, with one very important difference: it's not anonymous. We want people to establish a reputation. If you're really good, we want people to know you're good. If you're making contributions, we want that known. If you're an idiot, we want that known too.

During 2006–2007, Intellipedia editors awarded symbolic shovels to users to distinguish exemplary Wiki gardening and to encourage others in the community to contribute. A template with a picture of the limited-edition shovel (actually a trowel), was created to place on user pages for Intellipedians to show their gardening status. The handle bears the imprint: "I dig Intellipedia! It's wiki wiki, Baby." The idea was inspired by the barnstar, which is used on both Wikipedia and MeatballWiki for similar purposes. The shovels have since been replaced with a mug bearing the tag line, "Intellipedia: it's what we know".

Different agencies have experimented with other ways of encouraging participation. For example, at the CIA, managers have held contests for best pages with prizes such as free dinners.

Chris Rasmussen, knowledge management officer at the Defense Department's National Geospatial-Intelligence Agency (NGA), argues that "gimmicks" like the Intellipedia shovel, posters, and handbills, encourage people to use Web 2.0 tools like Intellipedia and are effective low-tech solutions to promote their use. Also, Rasmussen argues that "social software–based contributions should be written in an employee's performance plan".

Training
Several agencies in the Intelligence community, most notably the CIA and NGA, have developed training programs to provide time to integrate social software tools into analysts' daily work habits. These classes generally focus on the use of Intellipedia to capture and manage knowledge, but they also incorporate the use of the other social software tools. These include blogs, RSS, and social bookmarking. The courses stress immersion in the tools and instructors encourage participants to work on a specific project in Intellipedia. The courses also expose participants to social media technologies on the Internet.

Awards
In 2009, Don Burke and Sean P. Dennehy, two early and avid users of Intellipedia, were awarded with the "Homeland Security Service to America Medal" by the Partnership for Public Service. The award noted that they "Promoted information sharing across the intelligence community through the development and implementation of Intellipedia, a Wikipedia-like clearinghouse of intelligence expertise."

See also
 A-Space
 Bureaupedia—the FBI's online encyclopedia
 Classified website
 Diplopedia
 DoDTechipedia
 Intellipublia

References

Further reading
 Frank Ahrens. "A Wikipedia of secrets", The Washington Post, November 5, 2006.
 D. Calvin Andrus, Ph.D. Office of Application Services, Central Intelligence Agency. The wiki and the blog: Toward a complex adaptive intelligence community, Studies in Intelligence, Volume 49, Number 3, September 2005.
 Cody Burke. Freeing knowledge, telling secrets: Open source intelligence and development , CEWCES Research Papers, Bond University, May 2007.
 Matthew S. Burton. Connecting the Virtual Dots: How the Web Can Relieve Our Information Glut and Get Us Talking to Each Other , Studies in Intelligence, Vol 49, Number 3, September 2005.
 Gianluigi Cesta. The Intellipedia experiment or rather, shared secrets, Gnosis (Italian Intelligence magazine of AISI), No. 1, 2007. 
 Wilson P. Dizard III. Spy agencies adapt social software, federated search tools, Government Computer News, September 25, 2006.
 "U.S. intelligence unveils spy version of Wikipedia", Reuters, October 31, 2006.
 Scott Shane. Logged In and Sharing Gossip, er, Intelligence, The New York Times, September 2, 2007.

External links

 Official Intellipedia website (may require an Intelink Passport account)
 Declassified Intellipedia Entries (Archive)

2006 establishments in the United States
Enterprise wikis
Internet properties established in 2006
MediaWiki sites of the United States government
Open-source intelligence
United States intelligence agencies
Academic works about intelligence analysis